CoreaHancock is an acoustic live album by Chick Corea and Herbie Hancock. It was recorded over the course of several live performances in February 1978 and released in 1979. Corea has top billing on this album, as Hancock did for An Evening with Herbie Hancock & Chick Corea: In Concert, another recording of the same tour released on Hancock's label. The CD version heavily edits what was released on the final side of the vinyl version.

Hancock makes reference to Corea's albums Piano Improvisations Vol. 1 and Vol. 2 in his introduction of Corea on this album.

Track listing

Vinyl 
Side one
"Homecoming" (Corea) – 19:10
Side two
"Ostinato" (from "Mikrokosmos for Two Pianos, Four Hands") (Béla Bartók) – 2:37
"The Hook" (Corea, Hancock) – 13:15
Side three
"Herbie's Intro of Chick" – 0:41
"Bouquet" (Corea) – 18:13
Side four
"Maiden Voyage" (Hancock) – 10:42
"La Fiesta" (Corea) – 16:45

CD 
"Homecoming" (Corea) – 19:12
"Ostinato" (from "Mikrokosmos for Two Pianos, Four Hands") (Béla Bartók) – 3:02
"The Hook" (Corea, Hancock) – 13:30
"Bouquet" (Corea) – 19:22
"Maiden Voyage" (Hancock) – 8:26
"La Fiesta" (Corea) – 8:09

Personnel 
Musicians
 Chick Corea - piano, right channel
 Herbie Hancock - piano, left channel (except on "Bouquet")

Production
Phill Brown – mastering
Fred Catero – remixing, mixing
Tony Cohan – liner notes
Jeffrey Cohen – liner notes, associate producer
Les D. Cooper – remote recording crew
Biff Dawes – remote recording crew
Dennis Drake – remixing, digital remastering
Ellie Hughes – design
Tom Hughes – design
Rory Kaplan – engineer
Bernie Kirsh – engineer, editing
Michael Manoogian – design
Darryl Pitt – photography
Seth Rothstein – liner notes, preparation, CD preparation
David Rubinson – producer, remixing, mixing
Ray Thompson – remote recording crew
Billy Youdelman – remote recording crew

References 

Chick Corea live albums
Collaborative albums
Herbie Hancock live albums
1979 live albums
Polydor Records live albums
Albums produced by Dave Rubinson